In the United Kingdom, the Comprehensive Performance Assessment (CPA), conducted by the Audit Commission, assessed the performance of every local authority and the services that they provide for local people.

The Audit Commission first introduced CPA in 2002. It evolved in response to changes in the operational and regulatory environment, rising public expectations, and the performance of local government itself.

CPA measured how well councils delivered services for local people and communities. It looked at performance from a range of perspectives and combined a set of judgements to provide both a simply understood rating and a more complete picture of where to focus activity to secure improvement.

CPA was replaced by the Comprehensive Area Assessment in April 2009.

Note: CPA should not be confused with the Comprehensive Annual Financial Reports, or CAFR a practice started after World War II in the United States (replacing "off the books" practices such as "general fixed asset account group"); A CAFR is one of several standard Government financial reports.

References

External links 
 
 Audit Commission homepage
 District Council CPA Framework from 2006

Accounting in the United States
Government audit
Local government in the United Kingdom